Washington Cacciavillani (January 1, 1934 in Salto – 1999) was an Uruguayan professional football player and coach. He also held Italian citizenship.

1934 births
1999 deaths
Uruguayan footballers
Club Atlético River Plate (Montevideo) players
Serie A players
Serie B players
Aurora Pro Patria 1919 players
Inter Milan players
Ravenna F.C. players
Uruguayan expatriate footballers
Expatriate footballers in Italy
Uruguayan football managers
Cosenza Calcio managers
A.S.D. Ragusa Calcio managers
Association football midfielders
Footballers from Salto, Uruguay